I Am the Mother Too is a 2018 South Korean television series starring Lee In-hye, Woo Hee-jin, Alex Chu, Park Joon-hyuk, and Moon Bo-ryung. The series airs daily on SBS from 8:40 a.m. to 9:10 a.m. (KST).

Plot
A story of a woman who is surrogate mother, overcoming hardships and hurts, finding true love and happiness, and her maternal love transcends bloodline.

Cast

Main
 Lee In-hye as Yoon Ji-young
 Woo Hee-jin as Choi Kyung-shin
 Alex Chu as Shin Sang-hyuk
  as Shin Hyun-joon
  as Oh Hye-rim

Supporting

Chairman Shin's family
 Park Geun-hyung as Shin Tae-jong
 Yoon Mi-ra as Lim Eun-ja
 Song Yoo-an as Yeo Min-kyung
 Joo Sang-hyuk as Shin Tae-woong

People around Ji-young
 Hong Yeo-jin as Jo Young-ran
  as Yoon Ki-sook
  as Ji Dong-man
 Jung Joo-won as Ji Bong-kyu
  as Ji Se-young
  as Kang Sung-nam
  as Young-kyu

Extended
 Kim Tae-hee as prof. Kim Seon-jeong
  as Jung Jin-kook
  as chief Moon
  as Park Chang-hoon
  as Han Dong-soo
 Kim Eun-hye as Noh Mi-hyun
 Choi Yeo-won as Jung Eun-chae
  as Jenny

Ratings 
In this table,  represent the lowest ratings and  represent the highest ratings.
 NR denotes that the drama did not rank in the top 20 daily programs on that date.
N/A denotes that the rating is not known.

Awards and nominations

Notes

References

External links
  

Seoul Broadcasting System television dramas
2018 South Korean television series debuts
Korean-language television shows
South Korean romance television series
South Korean melodrama television series
2018 South Korean television series endings